A great number of words of French origin have entered the English language to the extent that many Latin words have come to the English language. 45% of all English words have a French origin. This suggests that 80,000 words should appear in this list; this list, however, only includes words imported directly from French, such as both joy and joyous, and does not include derivatives formed in English of words borrowed from French, including joyful, joyfulness, partisanship, and parenthood. It also excludes both combinations of words of French origin with words whose origin is a language other than French — e.g., ice cream, sunray, jellyfish, killjoy, lifeguard, and passageway— and English-made combinations of words of French origin — e.g., grapefruit (grape + fruit), layperson (lay + person), mailorder, magpie, marketplace, surrender, petticoat, and straitjacket. This list also excludes words that come from French but were introduced into the English language via a language other than French, which include commodore, domineer, filibuster, ketone,  loggia, lotto, mariachi, monsignor, oboe, paella, panzer, picayune, ranch, vendue, and veneer.

English words of French origin can also be distinguished from French words and expressions used by English speakers.

Although French is derived mainly from Latin (which accounts for about 60% of English vocabulary either directly or via a Romance language), it also includes words from Gaulish and Germanic languages (especially Old Frankish). Since English is of Germanic origin, words that have entered English from the Germanic elements in French might not strike the eye as distinctively from French. Conversely, as Latin gave many derivatives to both the English and the French languages, ascertaining that a given Latinate derivative did not come to the English language via French can be difficult in a few cases.

Historical context 

Most of the French vocabulary now appearing in English was imported over the centuries following the Norman Conquest of 1066, when England came under the administration of Norman-speaking peoples. William the Conqueror invaded the British Isles, distributing lands and property to Norman, Breton, Flemish, and French soldiers. As a result, Old French became the language of culture and the administration, evolving into Anglo-Norman French. The majority of the population of England continued to use their Anglo-Saxon language, but it was influenced by the language of the ruling elite, resulting in doublets. Consider for example the words for the meats eaten by the Anglo-Norman nobility and the corresponding animals raised by the Anglo-Saxon peasants: beef/ox, mutton/sheep, veal/calf, pork/pig, or pairs of words pertaining to different registers of language: commence/start, commerce/trade, continue/go on, depart/leave, disengage/withdraw, encounter/meet, maintain/uphold, marry/wed, menace/threat, purchase/buy, revenue/income, vend/sell. Words of French origin often refer to more abstract or elaborate notions than their Anglo-Saxon equivalents (e.g. liberty/freedom, justice/fairness), and are therefore of less frequent use in everyday language. This may not, however, be the case for all English words of French origin. Consider, for example, some of the most common words in English: able, car, chair, city, country, different, fine, fruit, journey, juice, just, part, people, person, place, real, stay, table, travel, use, very, and wait. 

After the rise of Henry Plantagenet to the throne of England, other forms of dialectal French may have gained in influence to the detriment of Anglo-Norman French (notably the variants of Anjou where the House of Plantagenet came from, and possibly Poitevin, the tongue of Eleanor of Aquitaine). With the English claim to the throne of France, the influence of the language in use at the royal court of France in Paris increased. The cultural influence of France remained strong in the following centuries and from the Renaissance onward borrowings were mainly made from Parisian French, which became the de facto standard language of France.

Notable fields of French influence

Feudalism 

Norman rule of England had a lasting impact on British society. Words from Anglo-Norman or Old French include terms related to chivalry (homage, liege, peasant, seigniorage, suzerain, vassal, villain) and other institutions (bailiff, chancellor, council, government, mayor, minister, parliament), the organisation of religion (abbey, clergy, cloister, diocese, friar, mass, parish, prayer, preach, priest, sacristy, vestment, vestry, vicar), the nobility (baron, count, dame, duke, marquis, prince, sir), and the art of war (armour, baldric, dungeon, hauberk, mail, portcullis, rampart, surcoat). Many of these words related to the feudal system or medieval warfare have a Germanic origin (mainly through Old Frankish) (see also French words of Germanic origin).

The Norman origin of the British monarchy is still visible in expressions like Prince Regent, heir apparent, Princess Royal where the adjective is placed after the noun, like in French.

Heraldry 

The vocabulary of heraldry has been heavily influenced by French (blazon, or, argent, sable, gules, passant), for more details see tinctures, attitudes, and charges of heraldry.

Sometimes used in heraldry, some mythological beasts (cockatrice, dragon, griffin, hippogriff, phoenix) or exotic animals (lion, leopard, antelope, gazelle, giraffe, camel, zebu, elephant, baboon, macaque, mouflon, dolphin, ocelot, ostrich, chameleon) draw their name from French. It is also the case of some animals native of Europe (via Anglo-Norman: eagle, buzzard, falcon, squirrel, coney, rabbit, leveret, lizard, marten, ferret, salmon, viper).

Military 

The vocabulary of warfare and the military include many words and expressions of French origin (accoutrements, aide-de-camp, army, artillery, battalion, bivouac, brigade, camouflage, carabineer, cavalry, cordon sanitaire, corps, corvette, dragoon, espionage, esprit de corps, état major, fusilier, grenadier, guard, hors-de-combat, infantry, latrine, legionnaire, logistics, matériel, marine, morale, musketeer, officer, pistol, platoon, reconnaissance/reconnoitre, regiment, rendezvous, siege, soldier, sortie, squad, squadron, surrender, surveillance, terrain, troop, volley). This includes military ranks: admiral, captain, colonel, corporal, general, lieutenant, sergeant. Many fencing terms are also from French.

Politics and economics 

The political/economic lexicon include many words of French origin like money, treasury, exchequer, commerce, finance, tax, liberalism, capitalism, materialism, nationalism, plebiscite, coup d'état, regime, sovereignty, state, administration, federal, bureaucracy, constitution, jurisdiction, district.

Law 

The judicial lexicon has also been heavily influenced by French (justice, judge, jury, attorney, court, case).

Diplomacy 

attaché, chargé d'affaires, envoy, embassy, chancery, diplomacy, démarche, communiqué, aide-mémoire, détente, entente, rapprochement, accord, treaty, alliance, passport, protocol.

Arts 

art, music, dance, theatre, author, stage, paint, canvas, perform, harmony, melody, rhythm, trumpet, note, director, gallery, portrait, brush, pallet, montage, surrealism, impressionism, fauvism, cubism, symbolism, art nouveau, gouache, aquarelle, collage, render, frieze, grisaille.

Architecture 

aisle, arcade, arch, vault, voussoir, belfry, arc-boutant, buttress, bay, lintel, estrade, facade, balustrade, terrace, lunette, niche, pavilion, pilaster, porte cochère.

Aviation and automobile engineering 

France played a pioneering role in the fields of aviation (nacelle, empennage, fuselage, aileron, altimeter, canard, decalage, monocoque, turbine) and automobile engineering or design (chassis, piston, arbor, grille, tonneau, berline, sedan, limousine, cabriolet, coupé, convertible).

Cuisine 

baba au rhum, beef, beef bourguignon, boudin, caramel, casserole, cassoulet, clafoutis, confit, consommé, cream, croissant, custard, filet mignon, fillet, foie gras, flognarde, fondant, fondue, gateau, gratin, madeleine, marmalade, mayonnaise, meringue, mille-feuille, mustard, mutton, navarin, pâté, pastry, petit four, pork, porridge, potage, pudding, puree, ragout, ratatouille, roux, salad, sauce, sausage, soufflé, soup, stew, terrine, trifle, veal, vol-au-vent.

Colours and Other Influences 

Other influences include the names of colours (ecru, mauve, beige, carmine, maroon, blue, orange, violet, vermilion, turquoise, lilac, perse, scarlet, cerise), vegetables or fruits (courgette, aubergine, cabbage, carrot, cherry, chestnut, cucumber, nutmeg, quince, spinach, lemon, orange, apricot), and months of the year (January, March, May, July, November, December).

Terms coined by French people 

Some of the French words that made their way into the English language were coined by French speaking inventors, discoverers or pioneers, or scientists: cinema, television, helicopter, parachute, harmonium, bathyscaphe, lactose, lecithin, bacteriophage, chlorophyll, mastodon, pterodactyl, oxide, oxygen, hydrogen, carbon, photography, stethoscope, thermometer, stratosphere, troposphere.

Named after French people 

Some French words were named after French people (from their family name), especially in the fields of science (ampere, appertisation, baud, becquerel, braille, coulomb, curie, daguerreotype, pascal, pasteurise, vernier), botany and mineralogy (begonia, bougainvillea, clementine, magnolia, dolomite, nicotine), fashion and style or any other cultural aspect (lavalier, leotard, recamier, mansard, chauvinism, kir, praline, saxophone, silhouette, guillotine).

Proper names 

The names of certain cities in non-francophone regions/countries entered English with French spelling (Louisville, Constance, Ypres, Bruges, Louvain, Turin, Milan, Plaisance, Florence, Rome, Naples, Syracuse, Vienna, Prague, Munich, Cologne, Aix-la-Chapelle, Seville, Constantinople).

In North America, the names of some of the Native American peoples or First Nations the French came in contact with first are from French (Sioux, Saulteaux, Iroquois, Nez Perce, Huron, Cheyenne, Algonquin). It is also the case of some place names such as Canada, Arkansas, Illinois, Maine, Michigan, Vermont, Baton Rouge, Boise, Chicago, Des Moines, Detroit.

Main patterns of influence 

Some words from Old French have been imported again from Middle French or Modern French, but have generally taken a more restrictive or specialised meaning the second time. Consider for instance these doublets : chair/chaise, chief/chef, luminary/luminaire, liquor/liqueur, castle/château, hostel/hotel, mask/masque, necessary/nécessaire, petty/petit, ticket/etiquette, troop/troupe, vanguard/avant-garde. Note that the word in French has kept the general meaning: e.g. château in French means "castle" and chef means "chief". Even when not imported several times in different forms, loanwords from French generally have a more restrictive or specialised meaning than in French: e.g. legume (in Fr. légume means "vegetable"), gateau (in Fr. gâteau means "cake").

In some cases, the English language has been more conservative than the French one with Old French words, at least in spelling if not in pronunciation: e.g. apostle (O.Fr. apostle / M.Fr. apôtre), castle (O.Fr. castel or chastel / M.Fr. château), forest (O.Fr. forest / M.Fr. forêt), vessel (O.Fr. vaissel / M.Fr. vaisseau). Other Old French words have even disappeared from Modern French: dandelion.

On the other hand, a move to restore the classical roots (Latin or Ancient Greek) occurred in the 16th and 17th centuries. Thus words from Old French saw their spelling re-Latinized. Although in most cases this did not affect their pronunciation (e.g. debt, doubt, indict, mayor), in some cases it did (e.g. abnormal, adventure, benefit). The ph transcription of words of Greek etymology was restored instead of the f. Thus fantosme became phantom, fesan became pheasant. This move occurred also in French, although less systematically: Old French farmacie became pharmacie ("pharmacy"), fenix became phénix ("phoenix"), but fantosme became fantôme ("phantom, ghost") and fesan became faisan ("pheasant").

Beside re-Latinization that blurred the French origin of some words (e.g. peradventure), other modifications in spelling have included folk etymology alterations (e.g. andiron, belfry, crayfish, female, gillyflower, gingerbread, penthouse, pickaxe, pulley).

Furthermore, the spelling of some words was changed to keep the pronunciation as close to the original as possible (e.g. leaven), whereas in other cases the French spelling was kept and resulted in totally different pronunciation than French (e.g. leopard, levee). Terms that most recently entered the English language have kept French pronunciation and spelling (ambiance, aplomb, arbitrage, armoire, atelier, barrage, bonhomie, bourgeoisie, brochure, bureau, café, camaraderie, catalogue, chandelier, chauffeur, coiffure, collage, cortège, crèche, critique, debris, décor, dénouement, depot, dossier, élite, entourage, ennui, entrepreneur, espionage, expertise, exposé, financier, garage, genre, glacier, intrigue, liaison, lingerie, machine, massage, millionaire, mirage, montage, panache, penchant, personnel, plaque, promenade, rapport, repertoire, reservoir, routine, sabotage, sachet, souvenir, tableau, terrain, tranche), though this may change with time (e.g. the initial h in hotel is not silent anymore, consider also the evolving pronunciation of herb, or garage). Expressions like femme fatale, faux pas, haute couture, bête noire and enfant terrible are still recognisably French.

Borrowings are not a one-way process (See Reborrowing), some words of French origin ultimately come from Old English (Anglo-Saxon words): e.g. bateau, chiffon, gourmet. While conversely English words of French origin made their way "back" into Modern French: budget, challenge, design, discount, establishment, express, fuel, gay, gin, humour, interview, jury, management, mess, pedigree, rave, record, reporter, spleen, sport, squat, standard, suspense, tennis, ticket, toast, toboggan, tunnel, vintage.

A–C

D–I

J–R

S–Z

See also 

 Influence of French on English
 Glossary of French words and expressions in English
 Law French
 Glossary of fencing (predominantly from French)
 Glossary of ballet (predominantly from French)
 Lists of English loanwords by country or language of origin
 List of English words of Gaulish origin
 List of English words of Latin origin
 List of English Latinates of Germanic origin
 Latin influence in English
 List of French words of Germanic origin
 List of French words of Gaulish origin
 List of French words of Arabic origin
 List of French words of English origin
 List of German words of French origin

References

External links 
Online Etymology Dictionary
Centre National de Ressources Textuelles et Lexicales